Bangkok Airways Flight 125 was a scheduled domestic flight from Don Mueang International Airport to Koh Samui Airport. Bangkok Airways Flight 125 was the first fatal accident of Bangkok Airways.

The accident was investigated by the International Civil Aviation Organization (ICAO) and the probable cause was determined to be spatial disorientation leading to a loss of control.

Accident
Flight 125 departed Don Mueang International Airport at 09:58 UTC. The flight was conducted under IFR and proceeded to climb to a flight level of 210. At 10:45 as the aircraft approached Koh Samui Airport, the crew contacted the control tower and were informed that runway 17 was active. The tower also advised that the weather was mild with rain southeast of the airport. Due to changing wind conditions on the ground the crew was instructed to use runway 35. While attempting to line up for runway 35, errors caused the crew to perform a missed approach. The tower directed the aircraft to make left turn to avoid mountains and flight 125 started a left roll with flaps fully extended in heavy rain. The crew became disoriented and began descending while still in a left roll. Bangkok Airways Flight 125 was the first fatal accident of Bangkok Airways.

Aircraft
The aircraft was a two-year-old Dash 8-100, registered HS-SKI, msn:172, first flown in 1989. At the time of the accident, the aircraft had accumulated 3,416 flight hours and 2,998 take-off/landing cycles.

References

Samut Prakan province
Aviation accidents and incidents in Thailand
Aviation accidents and incidents in 1990
Airliner accidents and incidents caused by pilot error
Accidents and incidents involving the De Havilland Canada Dash 8
1990 in Thailand
November 1990 events in Thailand